Dennilton is a town in Sekhukhune District Municipality in the Limpopo province of South Africa.

The town, which consists of 99.5% of Black residents, lies on the provincial border with Mpumalanga and many travel to their places of work in Gauteng on a daily basis. Before the town was incorporated into Limpopo it was part of Mpumalanga Province. Most people from this area do their shopping in Groblersdal, Middelburg, Marble Hall and Pretoria.

References

Populated places in the Elias Motsoaledi Local Municipality